Rocket Science is the 19th studio album by rock musician Rick Springfield.

Track listing

Personnel
Rick Springfield - lead vocals, guitar
George Bernhardt, George Nastos, Tim Pierce - guitar
George Doering - mandolin, acoustic guitar
Matt Bissonette - bass, backing vocals
Jim Cox - keyboards
Jorge Palacios - drums, percussion
Brandon Mgee, Chariya Bissonette, Josh Bissonette, Robbie Wyckoff, Windy Wagner - backing vocals

References

External links 
 Rick Springfield Official Website

2016 albums
Rick Springfield albums